City Creek Park is a public park in Salt Lake City, Utah, United States.

External links

 
 City Creek Park at SLC.gov

Parks in Salt Lake City